Aljoša Josić, known in France as Alexis Josic (Bečej, Kingdom of Serbs, Croats and Slovenes, 24 May 1921 - 10 March 2011) was a French architect.

Son of the Serbian painter Mladen Josić, he studied architecture in Belgrade, graduating in 1948. Due to his opposition to Tito's regime he emigrated to France, where he soon joined Georges Candilis and Shadrach Woods; together they established the practice Candilis-Josic-Woods. They became famous with their projects for Le Mirail, Toulouse, and for the Free University of Berlin.

In 1965 he established the Atelier Josic.

Bibliography
Jürgen Joedicke, Candilis, Josic, Woods, une décennie d'architecture et d'urbanisme, éd. Eyrolles, 1968, p. 224

References

External links
 Bobigny HLM Low Cost Housing in Paris by Woods, Candilis & Josic (with photos and drawings)

1921 births
2011 deaths
People from Bečej
French people of Serbian descent
20th-century French architects
Yugoslav emigrants to France